is a former Japanese football player.

Club statistics

References

External links

1983 births
Living people
Association football people from Shizuoka Prefecture
Japanese footballers
J2 League players
Japan Football League players
Hokkaido Consadole Sapporo players
Tochigi SC players
Mito HollyHock players
Fujieda MYFC players
Association football defenders
People from Fujieda, Shizuoka